Relyea is a surname which may refer to:

Charles M. Relyea (1863–1932), American illustrator
John Relyea (born 1972), Canadian bass-baritone opera singer
Mark Relyea, American sound editor
Robert Relyea (1930–2013), American film producer and executive